Agnieszka Pilat is a Polish-American artist and painter. Pilat specializes in rendering portraitures of technology to explore the relationship between humans and machines in the 21st century.

Early life 
Agnieszka Pilat grew up in Łódź, Poland during the height of the Cold War and witnessed the fall of the Polish People's Republic. Her mother was a gym-teacher, and her father was a pastry chef. In 1989, her father was able to buy the business he operated due to the new policies put forth by the post-Soviet government. Pilat commends this move by her parents as the saving grace of her family; her father's alcoholism slowly reversed after taking on new responsibilities. Her father went on to own several bakeries and successfully transitioned to the implementation of free-trade practices. In 2004, she moved to California to pursue a Bachelor of Fine Arts with an emphasis in illustration and painting.  While studying at the Academy of Art University in San Francisco, she developed a passion for portraiture and continues to emphasize this in her contemporary works.

Career 
Following the completion of her degree, Pilat operated a full-time studio in San Francisco where she painted portraits of people and industrial machines.  Much of her early work emphasizes the progression of time and the reality of the future. She has been featured in numerous venues and galleries such as the De Young Museum and Modernism. After spending several years in the Bay Area art scene, Pilat began to realize that prolific collectors and industry leaders under-appreciated her technical skills in favor of more abstract pieces.

Pilat's career began to change radically after meeting the developer Paul Stein. As an avid collector of art and salvageable items, Stein asked Pilat to create a custom painting for him, which resulted in the rendering of a vintage fire alarm bell as a portrait. Curiosity over her paintings became more prevalent among tech executives in Silicon Valley. Pilat began to seek out artistic opportunities with Bay Area tech giants and maintained residencies with organizations such as SpaceX, Wrightspeed, Autodesk and Waymo.

Once more commissions came, Pilat began to focus entirely on the representation of machines and devices instead of human portraiture. This newfound passion for cutting-edge technology, combined with interests in the future, led her to a residency with Boston Dynamics. By the Fall of 2020, Pilat had produced a variety of pieces featuring Spot, the yellow-dog-like robot created in Waltham, Massachusetts. While she no longer serves as a guest resident artist for Boston Dynamics, she continues to use the robot as both a source of inspiration and as a co-artist. By using the robot's apparatus to hold and paint with an oil stick, the two have completed a wide array of memorable works, such as a futuristic Madonna (representation of Mary).  Pilat's work has been featured in the fourth Matrix film, Matrix Resurrections, and has been bought by notable collectors including Craig McCaw, Jorn Lyssegen, Yuri Milner, Peter Hirshberg, and Steve Jurvetson.

She now splits her time between New York and San Francisco. The artist maintains a full-time studio in Chelsea, Manhattan. Pilat has put on numerous shows and exhibitions of her own work. In 2021, she conducted the Renaissance 2.0 solo exhibition, which depicted classic art in modern ways with augmented reality.

References

21st-century American painters
Living people
American women painters
American contemporary painters
21st-century painters
Polish women painters
Year of birth missing (living people)